Copelatus mancus is a species of diving beetle. It is part of the genus Copelatus, which is in the subfamily Copelatinae of the family Dytiscidae. It was described by Sharp in 1887.

References

mancus
Beetles described in 1887